Francesco Fontani (23 May 1748 – 4 December 1818) was a Florentine scholar, priest, historian, and librarian for the Biblioteca Riccardiana.

He was born in Florence, and studied first in the Seminary of the Collegio Eugeniano, then went on to teach rhetoric in the Collegio Bandinelli of Rome. He was known for his knowledge about ancient artifacts. In 1783, returning to Florence, he was appointed to the position previously held by Giovanni Lami, as librarian at Riccardiana, but also working for the Accademia della Crusca, and serving as parish priest for the church of Santa Lucia dei Magnoli. He appears to have been demoted for participating with revolutionary French forces during the Napoleonic occupation.

He helped publish Il viaggio pittorico della Toscana, a travel journey through Tuscany known for its vedute of the skylines of numerous towns at the start of the 19th-century. The book was published between 1801-1803 by Tipi del Tofani and engraved by the brothers Terreni. Reprinted after 1817 by Giovanni Marenigh.

References

1748 births
Italian librarians
18th-century Italian writers
18th-century Italian male writers
19th-century Italian writers
19th-century Italian male writers
1818 deaths